Gowd-e Akhand (also known as Gowd) is a village in Akhand Rural District, Central District, Asaluyeh County, Bushehr Province, Iran. At the 2006 census, its population was 44, in 5 families.

References 

Populated places in Asaluyeh County